Football at the 2010 South American Games in Medellín was held from March 22 to March 28. All games were played at Estadio Envigado, Estadio Itagüi.

Medal summary

Medal table

Group stage

Group A

Group B

5th/6th Placement

Bronze medal match

Gold Medal match

References

2010 South American Games
South
2010
2010